William Everhart Buildings, also known as the Everhart-Lincoln Building, is a historic commercial building located in West Chester, Chester County, Pennsylvania. It was built by Congressman William Everhart (1785-1868) about 1833, and is a three-story, three bay, rectangular brick building in the Federal style.  It measures 40 feet long and between 20 and 25 feet wide.  The front facade features a hipped roof second story wrought iron porch added in 1868.  The building housed a number of printing concerns, most notably newspapers.  It was the printing house where Abraham Lincoln's first biography was published on February 11, 1860, as an article in the Chester County Times.

It was listed on the National Register of Historic Places in 1979.  The William Everhart House was listed in 1984.

References

External links
 William Everhart Building, 28 West Market Street, West Chester, Chester County, PA: 3 photos, 4 data pages, and 1 photo caption page at Historic American Buildings Survey

West Chester, Pennsylvania
Commercial buildings on the National Register of Historic Places in Pennsylvania
Commercial buildings completed in 1833
Buildings and structures in Chester County, Pennsylvania
National Register of Historic Places in Chester County, Pennsylvania